Ali Babachahi (born 10 November 1942 in Bushehr, Iran) is an Iranian poet, writer, researcher, and literary critic.
 
Babachahi is one of Iran's most prominent postmodern writers and poets, and has published over 50 literary works in various forms. From 1989 onward, he has been engaged in the compilation of a dictionary of Persian language at the University Publication Center and also edited Adineh monthly magazine's poetic column.

The life and poetry of Ali Babachahi

Iranian poet and critic, Ali Babachahi, was born in 1942 in Bushehr, the southernmost port city in Iran. A graduate of Persian Literature from Shiraz university, he has been a sensational poet in the last three decades. His first book in Unreliability was published in 1968. This veteran poet established his controversial book My Drizzle in 1996, that established him as a pioneer in postmodern Iranian poetry. His essays and commentaries on "The Other Mode of Iranian Poetry" and postmodern literary views show his restless, dynamic mind. His works and interviews have always caused discussion among critics and poets. For ten years Babachahi was the poetry editor for Adineh, and ran a poetry workshop in Tehran.
He has already published 40 books; half are books of poems, and the other half concern poetry research, review and criticism. He also wrote a narrative verse for youngsters. Several of his poems have been rendered in Arabic, English, Spanish, Swedish, French and Kurdish. Remarkably, Ali Babachahi develops book by book and his poetic stages are unpredictable, bearing a resemblance in this regard to John Ashbery, the American poet.

Ideas on modern Iranian poetics
(Extracted from interviews) 

…"One must be absolutely modern" _ this dictum of Arthur Rimbaud bears a fresh significance in every age. Our poetry of the last decade has a kind of qualitative configuration, which I have termed "post-Nimaie poetry." Anyway I seek a sort of different writing, and have termed all categories of different writings – "Poetry in another Mode".
In my last book, Picasso in the Waters of Persian Gulf satire, paradox and grotesque are used- e.g.: The poet says happy those born as angels, who then go and learn a bit of humanness – drive a truck and empty eyes bulged out of out town!
 
…I don't if I am a postmodern poet. Anyway I don't believe in simplifying issues. The range of postmodernism may be stretched back as far as Homer. So a work must have postmodern demands. You can't fashion your work after Calvino's One Winter Night A Traveler and then become a postmodern author! My views on the situation of criticism today in Iran are elaborated in my article: “A Critique of Literary Criticism” published in Leaping Off The Line, but we certainly need more professional critics. I don’t believe in great leaders or authority in poetry. The age of heroism is long gone. Influential figures like Shamlou, however, may challenge poets in other genres. 
Vanguard poetry need not reject lyricism and offer just a collage of twisted nihilism. My recent lyrical poems deviate from established conventions of our classical poetics and even “plays” with modern dominant lyricism, a play whose actors are pun, irony, paradox and grotesque, not to reject elements like lobe and tolerance but to generate a not perspective on lyricism. 
New poetry de-standardizes previously valid concepts and deconstructs savior meta-narratives of heroism.
 
… the self referent aspect of language states that language does not only express meaning but it also makes meaning—words make forms, and poetic forms justify some sort of signification. The more the poetic forms rely on musical potential, the more distinct literary reference becomes.

… According to Lyotar: By language games, Wittgenstein means various applications of language. Thus poets struggle against a particular meaning dominating the society.

… I am both for and against meaning: I’m against meanings that are embedded in structures of expressions depending on a kind of power – ideological power of assimilation and familiarization of meaning. Defying these types of meaning my poetry attains other kinds of meaning. Standing on a pluralist and non-elitist point, I reject hierarchic viewpoint, linear narrative, and dogmas caused by binary oppositions. Hence I write texts, a sort of writing that cherishes “differences”.
A function of postmodern poetry goes along this saying of Lyotar that we must make our knowledge deeper than what goes on in language.

Published works 

Supportless 1967

The world and the blue lights 1970

Of the sun 1974

The Sound of Sand 1977

Who opened the cage? 1977

Spring souvenir 1977

From our graves comes the dawn 1981

The sailors’ songs 1989

The selected poems of Ali Babachahi - First Edition 1990

Traditional poetry and music of southern Iran 1990

The selected poems of Ali Babachahi - Second Edition 1993

The selected poems of Manuchehr Sheybani 1994

The soft rain is me – First Edition 1996

Directionless Sea (Delayed) 1997

Individual Predicates (Volume 1) 1997

My head is bothering me - First Edition 2000

Individual Predicates (Volume 2) 2001

Such a sweet song it is! 2001

Yes, my face is very suspicious 2002

A review of three decades of professional poetry 2002

I had gone whaling! 2003

The selected poems of Ali Babachahi - First Edition 2004

The most romantic ones 2005

The selected poems of Manouchehr Neyestani 2005

Oral history of Iran’s contemporary literature 2005

Jumping out of the line 2006

Today’s poetry, Today’s Woman 2007

You are more beautiful than madness 2008

Picasso in the waters of the Persian Gulf - First Edition 2009

Only the mermaids do not wound me 2009

Individual Predicates 2010

The selected poems of Ali Babachahi – Second/Third Edition 2011

Picasso in the waters of the Persian Gulf - Second Edition 2011

The thousand-day rain flower 2011

The thoughts and feelings of matthiola are enough for me 2012

The world is wrong 2012

Let’s collect shells (short poems) 2012

They fall in love in their own way! 2012

he pomegranate garden is this way 2012

In caves full of Daffodils 2013

Collected poems (Volume 1) 2013

My head is bothering me - Second Edition 2013

The ship full of secrets 2014

The attached predicates 2014

The door to the argument room 2015

People don’t have names in the evening 2016

References

20th-century Iranian poets
Iranian literary critics
1942 births
Living people
People from Bushehr
Iranian male poets
21st-century Iranian poets